Lake of the Dead (Norwegian title: , also known as Lake of the Damned) is a 1958 Norwegian mystery horror film directed by Kåre Bergstrøm. The film stars Henki Kolstad, Henny Moan and Georg Richter.

Plot
The film takes place 20–23 August 1958. Crime Author Bernhard Borge and his wife Sonja, psychoanalyst Kai Bugge, magazine editor Gabriel Mørk, lawyer Harald Gran and his fiancée Liljan Werner are six Oslo people who will visit Bjørn Werner (Liljan brother) in his cabin deep in the Østerdal forests. But, when the guests arrive, Werner is missing and his dog is found dead at a pond nearby.
It's not long before they begin to ponder the old legend that is associated with the place: a man is said to have killed his sister and her lover and then drowned himself in the lake. It is said that everyone who stays in the house—the murder's cabin—would be possessed by a strange attraction: They would be forced to drown themselves in the pond.
The company decides to solve the mystery, but soon it appears that they are exposed to the mysterious, fascinating powers that are tied to the lake.

Cast
 André Bjerke as Gabriel Mørk
 Bjørg Engh as Sonja, Bernhard's wife
 Henki Kolstad	as Bernhard Borge, crime writer
 Per Lillo-Stenberg as Bjørn Werner, Liljans brother
 Erling Lindahl as Kai Bugge, psychologist
 Henny Moan as Liljan Werner
 Øyvind Øyen as Bråten, policeman
 Georg Richter as Harald Gran
 Leif Sommerstad as Tore Gruvik, the ghost
 Inger Teien as Eva, Bjørn's girlfriend

Production

De dødes tjern was co-written and directed by Kåre Bergstrøm. The film itself is an adaption of Andre Bjerke’s 1942 novel of the same name.

Release

Critical response

De dødes tjern remains relatively obscure outside its home country. Reviews of the film have been mostly positive, with critics praising the film's atmosphere, cinematography, and soundtrack.
Author Barry Atkinson praised the film, stating that the film "benefits from eerie location work and Gunnar Sønstevold's ominous score."

Legacy
It was later nominated as the fourth-best film of all time in Norway in a test developed by Dagbladet in 1998, were 101 movie critics gave Norwegian movies points.

References

External links
 
 
 
 

1958 films
1950s crime films
1958 horror films
1950s mystery thriller films
1950s horror thriller films
Films based on Norwegian novels
Ghost films
Incest in film
Mystery horror films
Norwegian black-and-white films
Norwegian horror films
1950s Norwegian-language films
Films directed by Kåre Bergstrøm